Sproxton Quarry is a  geological Site of Special Scientific Interest north-east of Sproxton in Leicestershire. It is a Geological Conservation Review site.

The quarry exposes one of the most complete sections of the Middle Jurassic Lincolnshire Limestone Formation, together with the underlying Grantham and Northampton Sand Formations. It has rare ammonites. Sproxton Quarry is a Reference Section for the Grantham Formation.

References

Sites of Special Scientific Interest in Leicestershire
Geological Conservation Review sites